Tymowa may refer to the following places in Poland:
Tymowa, Lower Silesian Voivodeship (south-west Poland)
Tymowa, Lesser Poland Voivodeship (south Poland)